Mikal Bridges (born August 30, 1996) is an American professional basketball player for the Brooklyn Nets of the National Basketball Association (NBA). He played college basketball for the Villanova Wildcats, winning national championships in 2016 and 2018. Bridges was selected with the tenth overall pick by the Philadelphia 76ers in the 2018 NBA draft before being traded to the Phoenix Suns on draft night, where he was a part of the team that reached the 2021 NBA Finals. Nicknamed “The Warden”, Bridges holds the active record for the most consecutive games played, having not missed a game in his NBA career since being drafted.

Early life
Bridges is the son of Jack Bridges and Tyneeha Rivers, who gave birth to him at the age of 19 and raised him as a single mother. He grew up in Overbrook, Philadelphia, and nearby neighborhoods. He moved to Malvern, Pennsylvania in middle school. His second cousin is former La Salle player Tyrone Garland.

High school career
Bridges attended Great Valley High School in Malvern, Pennsylvania, where he was coached by Jim Nolan. He began to get serious about basketball in his sophomore year when he had a growth spurt to reach 6–6. As a junior, he averaged 20 points and eight rebounds per game. During his senior season, he was named First Team All-Class AAAA. He posted averages of 18.5 points, 7.2 rebounds, 2.4 assists, 2.4 blocks, and 1.6 steals per game as a senior. Bridges was named to the Philadelphia Inquirer's All-Southeastern Pa., boys basketball first team as a senior. In his career, he had 1,340 points and 511 rebounds. Coming out of high school, he was ranked by ESPNU as the 82nd best player nationally, and committed to Villanova in June 2013.

College career

Freshman year
Bridges redshirted his freshman season and assisted in scouting players. In his first year with Villanova, he appeared in all 40 games for the Wildcats. He said he had to do a lot of weightlifting and change his three-point shot. He had a key role coming off the bench in the 2016 NCAA tournament, scoring 11 points in a Final Four rout of the Oklahoma Sooners. Bridges won the NCAA championship along with his teammates for the school for the first time since 1985. He averaged 6.4 points, 3.2 rebounds, and 1.1 steals per game as a freshman. "He came in as a high school scoring phenom like they all do, so I'm really proud of how he has opened up his game defensively," coach Jay Wright said.

Sophomore year

Coming into the 2016–17 season, Bridges was slated to be the team's sixth man but started every game after Phil Booth went down with a knee injury in November. As a sophomore, Joe Juliano of The Philadelphia Inquirer wrote, "If there is such a thing as a five-tool player in college basketball, Mikal Bridges is the model." He became well-regarded as a lanky forward who could score and play excellent defense and often guarded the opposing team's best player. In the NCAA Tournament, he scored 13 points to help Villanova to a first round victory over Mount St. Mary's. Bridges averaged 9.8 points and 4.6 rebounds per game while making 54 percent of his field goal attempts and 39 percent of three point tries. He improved his scoring as the season progressed, averaging 12.3 points in his last 12 games of the regular season. Along with Creighton's Khyri Thomas and teammate Josh Hart, Bridges was one of three Big East defensive player of the year honorees, being third in the conference in steals with 1.9 per game.

Junior year
He was named to the 2017–18 preseason All-Big East second team. Bridges hit all six 3-point tries in a 24-point performance against Lafayette on November 17. On December 4, he scored a career-high 28 points to go with six rebounds and two blocks in an 88–72 victory over Gonzaga. Bridges scored 23 points in an overtime win against Seton Hall on March 2, 2018. At the conclusion of the regular season, he joined Jalen Brunson on the All-Big East first team. He was named MVP of the Big East tournament after scoring 28 points in the title game, a 76–66 overtime win over Providence.

As a junior Bridges averaged 17.7 points and 5.3 rebounds per game on 51 percent shooting, including 43.5 percent on 3-pointers. He received the Julius Erving Award for best small forward. On April 10, 2018, Bridges announced his intention to forgo his final season of collegiate eligibility and declare for the 2018 NBA Draft, where he was the 10th selection in the first round by the Philadelphia 76ers. He was later traded to the Phoenix Suns in exchange for the 16th pick, Zhaire Smith, and an unprotected 2021 first round pick.

Professional career

Phoenix Suns (2018–2023)
Bridges was selected with the tenth overall pick by his hometown team the Philadelphia 76ers in the 2018 NBA draft and was subsequently traded to the Phoenix Suns in exchange for the draft rights to Zhaire Smith and a 2021 first-round pick. Bridges joined the Suns for the 2018 NBA Summer League. He signed a 4-year, $17.6 million rookie-scale contract with the Suns on July 6, 2018. On October 6, it was announced that Bridges would miss the remainder of the preseason with an elbow injury.

Bridges played in the Suns' regular season opener to make his professional debut in a blowout 121–100 win over the Dallas Mavericks on October 17, 2018. Three days later, Bridges recorded his first points, rebounds, and assists of his professional career with 10 points, 4 rebounds, 2 assists, and 2 steals in a blowout loss against the Denver Nuggets. On November 14, he made his first career start in place of Trevor Ariza, scoring eight points in 25 minutes in a 116–96 win over the San Antonio Spurs. On February 2, 2019, Bridges recorded a season-high 20 points in a 118–112 loss to the Atlanta Hawks. On February 25, Bridges put up a season-high 8 assists to help the Suns break a franchise-record 17-game losing streak to win 124–121 over the Miami Heat. From January 22 until March 6, Bridges would get at least one steal in each game played throughout that time. He became the first rookie since Chris Paul to obtain a steal per game throughout a 20-game stretch. It was also the second-longest stretch for a rookie in franchise history behind Ron Lee. At the end of the season, Bridges became the only Suns player to play in all 82 games for the regular season.

On November 19, 2019, Bridges matched his career-high of 20 points in a 120–116 loss to the Sacramento Kings. On December 14, he grabbed a then career-high 10 rebounds in his first start of the 2019–20 NBA season in a 121–119 overtime loss to the San Antonio Spurs in Mexico City. Bridges then matched his then career-high 10 rebounds two days later in a 111–110 loss to the Portland Trail Blazers. On January 18, Bridges scored a season-high 26 points on 6–8 three-point shooting in a 123–119 win over the Boston Celtics. On March 8, Bridges got his first double-double with 21 points while matching his then career-high of 10 rebounds in a 140–131 win over the Milwaukee Bucks. In the 2020 NBA Bubble, Bridges started in all eight games at small forward for the Suns.

On January 9, 2021, Bridges set a new career-high of 34 points in a 125–117 win over the Indiana Pacers. He also helped the Suns start their season with a 7–3 record, their best 10-game start to a season since 2009. On May 13, Bridges posted a double-double with 21 points and a career-high 11 rebounds in a 118–117 win over the Portland Trail Blazers. During Game 2 of the 2021 NBA Finals, Bridges scored 27 points in a 118–108 win to give the Suns a 2–0 series lead. However, the Suns went on to lose the Finals in 6 games to the Milwaukee Bucks.

On October 17, 2021, Bridges and the Suns agreed to a 4-year, $90 million rookie contract extension. Bridges and the Suns finished the regular season with the league's best overall record at 64–18. Bridges received universal praise from players, coaches, fans, and reporters for his defense, finishing second in Defensive Player of the Year voting and being selected to his first All-Defensive First Team. On April 26, 2022, Bridges scored a playoff career-high 31 points, including five rebounds and four blocks in a 112–97 Game 5 win against the New Orleans Pelicans. In the Western Conference Semifinals, the Suns jumped to a 2–0 lead in the series against the Dallas Mavericks before losing in seven games. 

On November 9, 2022, Bridges scored a season-high 31 points along with nine rebounds, five assists and four steals in a 129–117 win  over the Minnesota Timberwolves. On November 16, He recorded a near triple-double with 23 points, 9 rebounds and a career-high 9 assists in a 130–119 win over the reigning champions Golden State Warriors.

Brooklyn Nets (2023–present)
On February 9, 2023, the Suns traded Bridges to the Brooklyn Nets, along with Cameron Johnson, Jae Crowder, four unprotected first-round picks, and a 2028 first-round pick swap in exchange for Kevin Durant and T.J. Warren. Upon joining the Nets, he was given the nickname, Brooklyn Bridges, a pun on the Brooklyn Bridge.

On February 11, Bridges made his Nets debut, putting up 23 points and six rebounds in a 101–98 loss to the Philadelphia 76ers. As of February 14, Bridges still holds the active record for the most consecutive games played with 367, making him the current iron man. On February 15, Bridges scored a career-high 45 points in a 116–105 win over the Miami Heat.

Career statistics

NBA

Regular season

|-
| style="text-align:left;"| 
| style="text-align:left;"| Phoenix
| style="background:#cfecec;"|  82* || 56 || 29.5 || .430 || .335 || .805 || 3.2 || 2.1 || 1.6 || .5 || 8.3
|-
| style="text-align:left;"| 
| style="text-align:left;"| Phoenix
| 73 || 32 || 28.0 || .510 || .361 || .844 || 4.0 || 1.8 || 1.4 || .6 || 9.1
|-
| style="text-align:left;"| 
| style="text-align:left;"| Phoenix
| style="background:#cfecec;"|  72* || style="background:#cfecec;"|  72* || 32.6 || .543 || .425 || .840 || 4.3 || 2.1 || 1.1 || .9 || 13.5
|-
| style="text-align:left;"| 
| style="text-align:left;"| Phoenix
| style="background:#cfecec;"|  82* || style="background:#cfecec;"|  82* || 34.8 || .534 || .369 || .834 || 4.2 || 2.3 || 1.2 || .4 || 14.2
|-
| style="text-align:left;"| 
| style="text-align:left;"| Phoenix
| 56 || 56 || 36.4 || .463 || .387 || .897 || 4.3 || 3.6 || 1.2 || .8 || 17.2
|- class="sortbottom"
| style="text-align:center;" colspan="2"| Career
| 365 || 298 || 32.1 || .499 || .376 || .848 || 4.0 || 2.3 || 1.3 || .6 || 12.2

Playoffs

|-
| style="text-align:left;"| 2021
| style="text-align:left;"| Phoenix
| 22 || 22 || 32.1 || .484 || .368 || .893 || 4.3 || 1.6 || 1.0 || .7 || 11.1
|-
| style="text-align:left;"| 2022
| style="text-align:left;"| Phoenix
| 13 || 13 || 38.5 || .478 || .394 || .933 || 4.7 || 2.8 || 1.1 || 1.0 || 13.3
|- class="sortbottom"
| style="text-align:center;" colspan="2"| Career
| 35 || 35 || 34.5 || .482 || .375 || .914 || 4.4 || 2.1 || 1.0 || .8 || 11.9

College

|-
| style="text-align:left;"| 2015–16
| style="text-align:left;"| Villanova
| 40 || 0 || 20.3 || .521 || .299 || .787 || 3.2 || .9 || 1.1 || .7 || 6.4
|-
| style="text-align:left;"| 2016–17
| style="text-align:left;"| Villanova
| 36 || 33 || 29.8 || .549 || .393 || .911 || 4.6 || 2.0 || 1.7 || .9 || 9.8
|-
| style="text-align:left;"| 2017–18
| style="text-align:left;"| Villanova
| 40 || 40 || 32.1 || .514 || .435 || .851 || 5.3 || 1.9 || 1.5 || 1.1 || 17.7
|- class="sortbottom"
| style="text-align:center;" colspan="2"| Career
| 116 || 73 || 27.3 || .525 || .400 || .845 || 4.3 || 1.6 || 1.4 || .9 || 11.3

Off the court
Bridges is a fan of the Los Angeles Rams and Philadelphia Phillies.

On April 29, 2022, Bridges signed a multi-year contract with G Fuel C.E.O. Clifford Morgan. He said that "I'm ecstatic to join the G FUEL team and I'm looking forward to being an ambassador for years to come, I love G FUEL products so I'm happy to align with the brand."

References

External links

DraftExpress profile
Villanova Wildcats bio
A Phoenix Sun rises: Mikal Bridges determined to be a complete player

1996 births
Living people
21st-century African-American sportspeople
African-American basketball players
All-American college men's basketball players
American men's basketball players
Basketball players from Philadelphia
Brooklyn Nets players
People from Malvern, Pennsylvania
Philadelphia 76ers draft picks
Phoenix Suns players
Shooting guards
Small forwards
Villanova Wildcats men's basketball players